Michael Futch O'Hara (September 15, 1932 – February 1, 2018) was an American volleyball player who competed in the 1964 Summer Olympics. He was born in Waco, Texas.

References

External links
 Biography of O'Hara

1932 births
2018 deaths
Sportspeople from Waco, Texas
American men's volleyball players
Olympic volleyball players of the United States
Volleyball players at the 1964 Summer Olympics
Volleyball players at the 1963 Pan American Games
Pan American Games silver medalists for the United States
Volleyball players at the 1959 Pan American Games
Pan American Games gold medalists for the United States
Pan American Games medalists in volleyball
Medalists at the 1963 Pan American Games
UCLA Bruins men's volleyball players